

Karl-Richard Koßmann (26 June 1896 – 10 June 1969) was a German general during World War II. He was a recipient of the Knight's Cross of the Iron Cross.

Awards and decorations

 Knight's Cross of the Iron Cross on 23 March 1945 as Oberst and commander of 74th Panzergrenadier Regiment

References
Citations

Bibliography

 

1896 births
1969 deaths
People from Uelzen
Major generals of the German Army (Wehrmacht)
German Army personnel of World War I
Recipients of the clasp to the Iron Cross, 1st class
Recipients of the Gold German Cross
Recipients of the Knight's Cross of the Iron Cross
German prisoners of war in World War II held by the Soviet Union
People from the Province of Hanover
Military personnel from Lower Saxony